The 2018 European Darts Matchplay was the ninth of thirteen PDC European Tour events on the 2018 PDC Pro Tour. The tournament took place at the Edel-optics.de Arena, Hamburg, Germany from 29 June–1 July 2018. It featured a field of 48 players and £135,000 in prize money, with £25,000 going to the winner.

Michael van Gerwen was the defending champion after defeating Mensur Suljović 6–3 in the previous year's final, and he retained his title by defeating William O'Connor 8–2 in the final.

Van Gerwen also threw the first European Tour nine-dart finish in over 5 years against Ryan Joyce in the second round.

Prize money
This is how the prize money is divided:

Prize money will count towards the PDC Order of Merit, the ProTour Order of Merit and the European Tour Order of Merit, with one exception: should a seeded player lose in the second round (last 32), their prize money will not count towards any Orders of Merit, although they still receive the full prize money payment.

Qualification and format 
The top 16 entrants from the PDC ProTour Order of Merit on 8 June will automatically qualify for the event and will be seeded in the second round.

The remaining 32 places will go to players from five qualifying events – 16 from the UK Qualifier (held in Wigan on 15 June), 8 from the West/South European Qualifier (held on 28 June), 6 from the Host Nation Qualifier (held on 28 June), 1 from the Nordic & Baltic Qualifier (held on 25 May) and 1 from the East European Qualifier (held on 25 February).

Peter Wright, who would have been the number 2 seed, withdrew from the tournament prior to the draw. James Wilson, the highest-ranked qualifier, was promoted to 16th seed. Jim Brown also withdrew prior to the draw. Two extra places were made available in the Host Nation Qualifier.

The following players will take part in the tournament:

Top 16
  Michael van Gerwen (champion)
  Michael Smith (second round)
  Rob Cross (second round)
  Daryl Gurney (third round)
  Joe Cullen (third round)
  Mensur Suljović (quarter-finals)
  Jonny Clayton (second round)
  Ian White (quarter-finals)
  Darren Webster (third round)
  Gerwyn Price (quarter-finals)
  Mervyn King (second round)
  Simon Whitlock (second round)
  Stephen Bunting (semi-finals)
  Kim Huybrechts (third round)
  Steve Beaton (second round)
  James Wilson (second round)

UK Qualifier
  Robert Owen (first round)
  Michael Barnard (first round)
  Jamie Bain (first round)
  Martin Atkins (first round)
  Keegan Brown (first round)
  Darren Johnson (first round)
  Paul Rowley (third round)
  Justin Pipe (quarter-finals)
  Luke Humphries (second round)
  Andy Boulton (semi-finals)
  Ryan Joyce (second round)
  Chris Dobey (second round)
  William O'Connor (runner-up)
  Robert Thornton (third round)
  Mark Wilson (first round)
  Jason Lowe (third round)

West/South European Qualifier
  Cristo Reyes (first round)
  Vincent van der Voort (first round)
  Ronny Huybrechts (first round)
  Mike De Decker (first round)
  Dirk van Duijvenbode (first round)
  Jermaine Wattimena (first round)
  Mario Robbe (first round)
  Jelle Klaasen (third round)

Host Nation Qualifier
  Max Hopp (second round)
  René Eidams (first round)
  Robert Marijanović (second round)
  Martin Schindler (second round)
  Dragutin Horvat (first round)
  Maik Langendorf (second round)

Nordic & Baltic Qualifier
  Darius Labanauskas (second round)

East European Qualifier
  Boris Koltsov (second round)

Draw

References

2018 PDC European Tour
2018 in German sport
Sports competitions in Hamburg
June 2018 sports events in Germany
July 2018 sports events in Germany
2010s in Hamburg